Lokahteikpan is a Buddhist temple in Bagan, Burma, founded c. 1125. This temple is known for its frescos, which contain painted inscriptions that are among the oldest documents in the Old Burmese language.

References
U Ba Shin (1962). The Lokahteikpan. Rangoon: Burma Historical Commission, Ministry of Union Culture, Revolutionary Govt., Union of Burma.

Buildings and structures in Mandalay Region
Buddhist temples in Myanmar
Religious buildings and structures completed in 1125
12th-century Buddhist temples